Elingen is a village in the municipality of Pepingen, in the Belgian province of Flemish Brabant.

Populated places in Flemish Brabant